This is a list of episodes for the SVT television series Skärgårdsdoktorn.

References

External links 

Skargardsdoktorn